Margariscus, known as the pearl daces, is a genus of leusiscid fishes found in North America. There are currently two recognized species in this genus. Margariscus comes from the Greek word margariskos, meaning pearl.

Species
 Margariscus margarita (Cope, 1867) (Allegheny pearl dace)
 Margariscus nachtriebi (Cox, 1896) (Northern pearl dace)

References
 

 
Fish of North America